New Vision may refer to:

 New Vision (newspaper), a Ugandan English language newspaper.
 New Vision Group, a Ugandan publishing group
 New Vision (Neues Sehen), a photographic movement of the 1920s and 1930s
 New Vision Display, a Californian display screen manufacturing company
 New Vision (electoral alliance), an electoral alliance in the Republic of Ireland
 New Vision Gallery, a former art gallery in Auckland, New Zealand
 New Vision Party, a political party in the Republic of Ghana
 New Vision Television, a Californian broadcasting company
 Al Ru’yah al Jadida (The New Vision) - a 20th-century artists' collective in Iraq